The Collège Sainte-Barbe is a former college in the 5th arrondissement of Paris, France.

The Collège Sainte-Barbe was founded in 1460 on Montagne Sainte-Geneviève (Latin Quarter, Paris) by Pierre Antoine Victor de Lanneau, teacher of religious studies, as a college of the University of Paris. It was until June 1999 the "oldest" college of Paris.

The Barbiste Spirit is kept alive through the Friendly Association of Old Barbistes, founded in 1820, recognized a public society since 1880, which is the oldest association of alumni of France, "l'Association Amicale des Anciens Barbistes".

Alumni

Former Barbists (ordered by date of birth) include:

 Diogo de Gouveia (1471–1557)
 Ignace de Loyola (1491–1556)
 André de Gouveia (1497–1548)
 St. François-Xavier (1506–1552), Roman Catholic missionary to India, China, and Southeast Asia
 Pierre Lefevre (1506–1546)
 Guillaume Postel (1510–1581)
 Achilles Statius (1524–1581)
 Michel Adanson (1727–1806),naturalist)
 Jean Baptiste Louis Romé de Lisle (1736–1790), founder of crystallography
 Jacques-Étienne Montgolfier (1745–1799)
 Felix Dupanloup (1802–1878), bishop
 James Manby Gully (1808–1883), pioneer of hydrotherapy
 Warren De la Rue (1815–1889), British astronomer
 Gustave Eiffel (1832–1923), engineer
Sarkis Balyan (1835–1899)
 Arsène d'Arsonval (1851–1940), physicist and doctor
 Constantin Costa-Foru (26 October 1856 – 15 August 1935)
 Alfred Dreyfus (1859–1939)
 Jean Jaurès (1859–1914)
 Émile Borel (1871–1956), mathematician
 Charles Péguy (1873–1914)
 Louis Blériot (1872–1936) Engineer and pioneer aviator
 Henri-George Clouzot (1907–1977), scenario writer
 the actors Michel Piccoli (born 1925)
 Claude Lelouch (born 1937), scenario writers
 Bernard Kouchner (born 1939)
 François Berléand (born 1952)

Former faculty
Among the former professors are the historian Jules Michelet (1798–1874) and the journalist Serge July (born 1942).

Buildings
The buildings of the college have undergone numerous modifications since its establishment in 1460. A university library, the Sainte-Barbe Library, has opened to the public in March 2009.

Notes

References

Schools in France
Buildings and structures in the 5th arrondissement of Paris
1460 establishments in Europe
1460s establishments in France
Former buildings and structures in Paris
Latin Quarter, Paris